Gábor Halmai (born 7 January 1972) is a retired Hungarian football player.

He made his debut for the Hungarian national team in 1993, and got 57 caps and 4 goals until 2001.

International goals

Honours
 Hungarian League: 1993, 1997, 1999; Runner up 2000
 Hungarian Cup: 1997, 1998, 2000
 Belgian Cup: Runner-up 1995
 Toto Cup (Ligat ha'Al/Liga Leumit): 2002

References

1972 births
Living people
Hungarian footballers
Hungary international footballers
Nemzeti Bajnokság I players
Belgian Pro League players
Budapest Honvéd FC players
MTK Budapest FC players
Hapoel Tel Aviv F.C. players
Beerschot A.C. players
Hungarian expatriate footballers
Expatriate footballers in Israel
Expatriate footballers in Belgium
Association football midfielders